Lyngbya majuscula is a species of filamentous cyanobacteria in the genus Lyngbya.  It is named after the Dane Hans Christian Lyngbye.

As a result of recent genetic analyses, several new genera were erected from the genus Lyngbya: e.g., Moorea, Limnoraphis, Okeania, Microseira, and Dapis.

Almost 300 different secondary metabolites have been isolated from specimens identified as L. majuscula. However, most of these studies lack a molecular identification of the samples. Several specimens identified as L. majuscula and collected in marine tropical regions are now classified as members of the genera Okeania and Moorea.

Antillatoxin and Kalkitoxin have been reported to be extracted from this microbe.  L. majuscula is the cause of seaweed dermatitis.

References

Oscillatoriales